Plantibacter auratus is a Gram-positive, aerobic short rod-shaped and non-motile bacterium from the genus Plantibacter.

References

Microbacteriaceae
Bacteria described in 2006